Arthur Curtis may refer to:

 Arthur Hale Curtis (1881–1955), American football player and coach, gynecologist
 Arthur R. Curtis (1842–1925), Union Army officer during the American Civil War
 Sir Arthur Colin Curtis, 3rd Baronet (1858–1898), of the Curtis baronets

See also
Curtis (surname)